The Transnet Freight Rail Class 44-000 of 2015 is a South African diesel-electric locomotive operated by Transnet Freight Rail.

History
In 2014, Transnet Freight Rail ordered 233 GE ES40ACis from General Electric.

The first six were built in the United States by General Electric in Erie, Pennsylvania, in April and July 2015. In October 2015 the first of 227 locally-built locomotives was nearing completion at the Koedoespoort shops in Pretoria, while the first two of the six imported locomotives were undergoing testing on the line between Pyramid South and Warmbad.

The core components, such as the GEVO-12 prime movers, were manufactured in the United States, with locomotive construction and final assembly taking place at Koedoes­poort. The contract required a minimum local content for rolling stock of 55%.

References

External links

Cape gauge railway locomotives
Co-Co locomotives
Diesel-electric locomotives of South Africa
General Electric locomotives
Railway locomotives introduced in 2015
Transnet Rail Engineering locomotives